Dex Media, Inc. was a print and interactive marketing company. It was formed in 2002 by a consortium led by The Carlyle Group to acquire the operations of QwestDex from Qwest Communications International. The company went public in 2004 and was acquired by R.H. Donnelley in 2006, which became DEX One in 2010.

History

U S WEST Dex
In 1988, U S WEST began marketing its telephone services under the one "U S WEST" name. U S WEST, in 1995, divided its companies into two core divisions: U S WEST Communications, and U S WEST Media Group. U S WEST placed its directory operations in the hands of the Media Group, creating U S WEST Dex. U S WEST Dex, Inc. became the new name of U S West's publishing company.

QwestDex

In 2000, Qwest Communications International acquired U S West. As a result, U S West was renamed Qwest, and U S WEST Dex, Inc. was renamed Qwest Dex, Inc. In 2002, Qwest underwent a drastic reorganization, and Qwest searched for a buyer for QwestDex, Inc.

Dex Media
On August 20, 2002, The Carlyle Group, Welsh, Carson, Anderson & Stowe, along with other private investors, led a $7.5 billion buyout of QwestDex. The buyout was the third largest corporate buyout since 1989.

QwestDex's purchase occurred in two stages. In November 2002, directory operations in Colorado, Iowa, Minnesota, Nebraska, New Mexico, North Dakota & South Dakota were acquired for $2.75 billion. These operations were known as Dex Media East LLC. In 2003, directory operations in Arizona, Idaho, Montana, Oregon, Utah, Washington and Wyoming were acquired for $4.30 billion. These operations became known as Dex Media West LLC.

After completion of the formation of Dex Media, Dex signed a 50-year agreement with Qwest to be the official directory provider to Qwest local telephone customers.

The sale of QwestDex marked the first time a Baby Bell sold its telephone directory operations.

In July 2004, Dex Media went public and began trading on the NYSE under the ticker "DEX".

On October 3, 2005, R. H. Donnelley Corporation announced its intent to acquire Dex Media. RHD's acquisition of Dex was completed on January 31, 2006. Following RHD's 2009 bankruptcy, it renamed itself Dex One Corporation retaining its headquarters in Cary, North Carolina.

In August 2012, Dex One and SuperMedia LLC announced their two companies would be merging to form Dex Media, Inc. The merger was completed on April 30, 2013 and the company began trading publicly on the NASDAQ stock exchange on May 1, 2013 under the symbol DXM. In August 2013, Geoff Fitzgibbons, visionary of the orange bundles, resigned leaving a post he held under three previous mergers.

See also
Qwest

References

External links
 
 

Lumen Technologies
Publishing companies established in 2002
Telephone directory publishing companies of the United States
2002 establishments in the United States